Douglas Robb may refer to:

 Douglas J. Robb, physician in the U.S. Air Force
 Sir Douglas Robb (surgeon) (1899–1974), New Zealand heart surgeon
 Douglas Robb (schoolmaster) (born 1970), headmaster of Gresham's School, England
 Doug Robb, lead vocalist and founding member of Hoobastank, an American rock band active since 1994